White Desert Ltd. is a British tour operator conducting expeditions to Antarctica. As of 2021, it is the only company to offer a commercial private jet service to the continent. Its Whichaway Camp is described by multiple publications as Antarctica's first and only hotel.

History
British couple and polar explorers Robyn and Patrick Woodhead founded White Desert in London, England, in December 2005, setting out to "make [Antarctica] accessible to everyone, not just explorers."

A maximum of twelve guests per group are flown from Cape Town, South Africa, to Whichaway Camp, the primary base camp located in Queen Maud Land, Antarctica, via various private aircraft. Flights operate into and out of Wolf's Fang Runway, Queen Maud Land.

Built in 2012 on the Schirmacher Oasis, Whichaway Camp consists of several guest "pods" that respectively contain bedrooms, bathrooms, dining rooms, and a library, heated by solar power. The camp underwent extensive renovations in 2016. It is intended to be removed entirely from the site at the end of its natural lifespan.

Apart from amenities, the company offers trips to nearby structures, a guided wildlife tour, and a trip to the Geographic South Pole. The company operates only from November to January due to Antarctica's harsh climate during the rest of the year.

Several publications have noted the company's luxury status and exclusivity, as prices range from roughly US$ 30,000 to almost US$ 200,000 per customer. The founders have justified the high prices, citing extraordinarily high logistical expenses associated with transportation and accommodation of guests on Antarctica.

White Desert is a member of the International Association of Antarctica Tour Operators.

On 2 November 2021, a HiFly Airbus A340-300 (9H-SOL) landed on the Wolf's Fang Runway on a flight from Cape Town, becoming the largest aircraft to ever land there and the first Airbus A340 to land in Antarctica.

Awards and recognition
White Desert has received the World Travel Award for Leading Polar Expedition Operator five times, first in 2012 and consecutively from 2014 to 2017. Elite Traveler has included the company in its list of the top 50 adventures of 2017.

References

External links

Companies based in London
British companies established in 2005
Hospitality companies established in 2005
Tourism in Antarctica